The 2021–22 LNH Division 1 (known as the Liqui Moly StarLigue for sponsorship reasons) was the 70th season of the LNH Division 1, French premier handball league and the 45th season consisting of only one league. It ram from 10 September 2021 to 8 June 2022.

Paris Saint-Germain won their ninth title.

Teams

Team changes

Arenas and locations
The following 16 clubs compete in the LNH Division 1 during the 2021–22 season:

League table

Statistics

Top goalscorers

Awards
The awards were announced on 10 June 2022.

All-star team
The all-star team was announced on 10 June 2022.

See also
 2021–22 Coupe de France
 2021–22 Coupe de la Ligue
 2021–22 LNH Division 2

References

External links
Official website - Liqui Molly StarLigue

Handball leagues in France
Handball
Handball
France